The Bastide d'Orcel is a historic bastide in Aix-en-Provence, France. It is located on the route de Galice in Aix-en-Provence, in southeastern France.

The bastide was completed in 1777, a decade before the French Revolution of 1789. It has been listed as an official historical monument by the French Ministry of Culture since 1984.

References

Houses completed in 1777
Monuments historiques of Aix-en-Provence